Sengann (modern spelling: Seangann), son of Dela, of the Fir Bolg, was a legendary High King of Ireland, succeeding his brothers Gann and Genann. His wife was Anust.

When the Fir Bolg invaded Ireland the five sons of Dela divided the island amongst themselves. Sengann landed with Gann at Inber Dubglaise and the pair divided Munster between them, Sengann taking the south and Gann the north of the province.

After death of Gann and Genann of plague, Sengann ruled Ireland for five years, before he was killed by Fiacha Cennfinnán, his brother Rudraige's grandson.

Primary sources
Lebor Gabála Érenn
Annals of the Four Masters
Geoffrey Keating's Foras Feasa ar Érinn

Legendary High Kings of Ireland
Fir Bolg